Daniel Plai (born 5 September 1994) is a Romanian rugby union football player. He plays as a scrum-half for professional SuperLiga club Steaua București.

Career

Daniel Plai played during his career for Politehnica Iași from where he transferred to Steaua in 2018.

References

External links

1994 births
Living people
People from Gura Humorului
Romanian rugby union players
CSA Steaua București (rugby union) players
CS Politehnica Iași (rugby union) players
Rugby union scrum-halves
Romania international rugby union players